Margery Hinton (25 June 1915 – 18 February 1996) was an English breaststroke and freestyle swimmer who competed for Great Britain in the 1928 Summer Olympics, 1932 Summer Olympics, and 1936 Summer Olympics. She was born in Manchester.

In 1928 she was eliminated in the first round of the 200-metre breaststroke event. At these Games she was the youngest member of the Great Britain team. Four years later she finished fourth in the 200-metre breaststroke competition. At the 1936 Games she was eliminated in the first round of the 100-metre freestyle event.

Hinton first appeared at the Summer Olympics aged 13 years and 44 days. Her record, of being the youngest British competitor to appear at the Summer Olympics, remained unbroken for 93 years, until skateboarder Sky Brown appeared at the 2020 Summer Olympics aged 13 years and 11 days.

See also 
 World record progression 200 metres breaststroke

References

External links 
Margery Hinton's profile at Sports Reference.com

1915 births
1996 deaths
Sportspeople from Manchester
English female swimmers
Olympic swimmers of Great Britain
Swimmers at the 1928 Summer Olympics
Swimmers at the 1932 Summer Olympics
Swimmers at the 1936 Summer Olympics
Swimmers at the 1930 British Empire Games
Swimmers at the 1934 British Empire Games
Swimmers at the 1938 British Empire Games
Commonwealth Games gold medallists for England
Commonwealth Games silver medallists for England
Commonwealth Games bronze medallists for England
World record setters in swimming
European Aquatics Championships medalists in swimming
Commonwealth Games medallists in swimming
20th-century English women
Medallists at the 1930 British Empire Games
Medallists at the 1934 British Empire Games
Medallists at the 1938 British Empire Games